, better known as  is a retired Japanese professional wrestler and professional wrestling promoter. At age 13, he entered sumo wrestling and stayed there for 13 years, after which he turned to Western-style professional wrestling. "Tenryu" was his shikona. He had two stints with All Japan Pro Wrestling (AJPW), where he spent the majority of his career while also promoting Super World of Sports (SWS), Wrestle Association R (WAR) and Tenryu Project. At the time of his retirement, professional wrestling journalist and historian Dave Meltzer wrote that "one could make a strong case [that Tenryu was] between the fourth and sixth biggest native star" in the history of Japanese professional wrestling.

Sumo wrestling career 

As a sumo wrestler, Tenryu was ranked as a sekitori for 27 tournaments, 16 of them in the top makuuchi division. His highest rank was maegashira 1.  Upon the death of his stablemaster at Nishonoseki stable he wanted to join former stablemate Daikirin's newly established Oshiogawa stable, which had just broken off from Nishonoseki, but the Japan Sumo Association insisted he stay at Nishonoseki whose new stablemaster, Kongō, he did not get along with.  He finished one more tournament, and even though his career still showed promise, he decided to leave the sumo world at the young age of 26 in September 1976.

Professional wrestling career

All Japan Pro Wrestling (1976–1990) 
Scouted by Giant Baba, the All Japan Pro Wrestling (AJPW) owner, Tenryu was sent to Amarillo, Texas to be trained by Dory Funk Jr. and Terry Funk, and debuted in Texas in 1976, against Ted DiBiase. After returning to Japan, he stayed in the undercard until about 1982 when he began to get a slight push in that year's Champion Carnival tournament. In 1983, following a brief stint in Jim Crockett Promotions, his push began in earnest when Jumbo Tsuruta pursued the NWA International heavyweight title, now the main title in the Triple Crown Heavyweight Championship.

1984 saw Tenryu winning the NWA United National title, now also part of the Triple Crown, as well as the NWA International tag team title with Tsuruta. Their combination was called "Kakuryu" ( = kaku = tsuru (the "tsuru" in Tsuruta) +  = ryū in Tenryū). The team feuded with Riki Choshu and Yoshiaki Yatsu, who were the leaders in an "invasion" angle by the Japan Pro Wrestling promotion, an All Japan satellite made up of former New Japan Pro-Wrestling talent.

In 1987, following the departure of the Japan Pro talent, Kakuryu broke up after losing the tag team titles to The Road Warriors, which led to Tenryu forming his own stable, "Revolution", with former International Pro Wrestling wrestlers Ashura Hara and Hiromichi Fuyuki, as well as All Japan rookies Toshiaki Kawada, and Yoshinari Ogawa; Tatsumi Kitahara would join the group upon his debut in 1988. Tenryu and Hara feuded with Tsuruta and his new partner Yatsu over the Pacific Wrestling Federation World tag team titles and later with their replacement, the World Tag Team Championship (a combination of the PWF World and NWA International tag belts). Hara was kicked out of the promotion in late 1988, and Tenryu replaced him with Stan Hansen, with whom he held the World Tag Team Championship as well.

1989 was Tenryu's banner year. Tsuruta became the first Triple Crown champion on April 18 of that year, and just two days later Tenryu became his first challenger. The Tsuruta-Tenryu series that ensued set the standard for all Triple Crown matches and feuds to follow. When Tenryu won the belts on June 5, the match was so spectacular it was deemed Match of the Year by major Japanese publications. The same year saw him finally pin his mentor Baba, albeit in a tag match - but still a major success for a Japanese wrestler. Only Mitsuharu Misawa would duplicate this feat. In addition, Tenryu was chosen to be one-third of the NWA World 6-Man Tag Team Champions with the Road Warriors after the Road Warriors turned heel against their former co-holder of the title, Dusty Rhodes. However, the relationship between All Japan Pro Wrestling and the NWA was significantly strained when Tenryu and the Road Warriors were scheduled to compete in a match Baba had advertised to his Japanese audience, but American booking decisions prevented the match from taking place. This created an uncomfortable situation where Giant Baba had to apologize to his Japanese audience for a match he had promoted not taking place, and was a key factor in All Japan Pro Wrestling's ultimate withdrawal from the NWA. This also resulted in the six man championship being vacated and abandoned until 1991, when it was temporarily resurrected as a World Championship Wrestling championship.
Tenryu's most high-profile North American match was for the World Wrestling Federation in 1991 at WrestleMania VII, where he teamed with Koji Kitao to defeat Demolition. He also appeared in both the 1993 Royal Rumble and 1994 Royal Rumble; in the latter he made it to the final five but was eliminated by eventual co-winners Lex Luger and Bret Hart. An angle had he and The Great Kabuki hired as mercenaries by Yokozuna's manager, Mr. Fuji, to attack The Undertaker and prevent him from winning.

Super World of Sports and WAR (1990–1999) 
In April 1990, Tenryu left All Japan to form Super World of Sports (SWS). After its collapse in June 1992, Tenryu, aided by Masatomo Takei (brother of his wife Makiyo) formed Wrestling and Romance (WAR). WAR became his base from where he would take on top wrestlers from other promotions, such as Atsushi Onita, Nobuhiko Takada, The Great Muta, Shinya Hashimoto and Masahiro Chono, all of whom he defeated. He also traded victories with Tatsumi Fujinami and Antonio Inoki, thus becoming the only Japanese wrestler to defeat both Inoki and Baba by pinfall.

In 1998, as WAR went into decline, Tenryu began an earnest comeback, this time in New Japan. He first joined Heisei Ishingun, allied with its leader Shiro Koshinaka, and they won the IWGP Tag Team Championship from Team Wolf, Masahiro Chono and Hiroyoshi Tenzan. In December 1999, Tenryu made history as the first native to win the top two distinctions of professional wrestling in Japan (All Japan's Triple Crown and New Japan's IWGP Heavyweight title) by beating Mutoh for the IWGP title. (The first man to win both titles was Big Van Vader, an American.)

Return to AJPW (2000–2004) 
In 2000, following the near-collapse of All Japan due to the Pro Wrestling Noah split, Tenryu closed WAR and rejoined All Japan, eager to test his mettle against the remaining ace, his former disciple Kawada. Tenryu beat Kawada in the subsequent tournament for the vacant Triple Crown, winning the belts for a second time. In his second stay in All Japan, he would capture the belts a third time and also the World Tag Team Championship with former WAR-UWFI feud rival Yoji Anjo.

Late career and retirement (2004–2015) 
In 2003, he joined Fighting World of Japan Pro Wrestling for a few matches, but as it declined rapidly, he switched back and forth aimlessly between New Japan and All Japan.

In 2005, he entered Noah, and began feuds with Misawa, Kenta Kobashi, and other wrestlers he knew from his first All Japan stint, as well as new faces he's never met in the ring before, such as Jun Akiyama. Tenryu has also been with the HUSTLE promotion and was a part of the main heel group led by Generalissimo Takada. During this time, he teamed with Toshiaki Kawada mainly. At HUSTLE Aid 2007, however, Tenryu was defeated by Razor Ramon HG and joined the main face group led by Razor Ramon HG, HUSTLE Army.

In December 2009, following the folding of Hustle, Tenryu began running his own Tenryu Project promotion. He continued to make forays into other promotions, remaining active even past age 60.

On February 7, 2015, it was reported that Tenryu had decided to retire from professional wrestling with his final match scheduled to take place later in the year. Tenryu held a press conference two days later to confirm the report, announcing that his retirement event would be taking place in November and would feature participation from All Japan, New Japan and Noah. On August 16, Tenryu made a surprise return to New Japan, having a confrontation with Kazuchika Okada to set up his retirement match on November 15. In the meantime, he embarked on a multipromotional "Retirement Road" tour, including matches in Kyushu Pro Wrestling, DDT, BJW, Wrestle-1 and Pro Wrestling FREEDOMS. On November 15, Tenryu was defeated by Okada in his retirement match. Tokyo Sports named Tenryu's retirement match the 2015 Match of the Year.

Other media 
Tenryu appears as a gang member in the 2017 video game Yakuza Kiwami 2, alongside Keiji Mutoh, Masahiro Chono, Riki Choshu and Tatsumi Fujinami.
Tenryu is also a regular guest on the annual 24-hour comedy special, Gaki no Tsukai - No Laughing Challenge, often appearing as a character who occasionally (and intentionally) speaks unintelligibly to cause the contestants to laugh.

Championships and accomplishments 
 All Japan Pro Wrestling
All Asia Tag Team Championship (1 time) – with Masanobu Fuchi
 NWA International Tag Team Championship (2 times) – with Jumbo Tsuruta
 NWA United National Championship (2 times)
 PWF World Heavyweight Championship (1 time)
 PWF World Tag Team Championship (1 time) – with Ashura Hara
 Triple Crown Heavyweight Championship (3 times)
 World Tag Team Championship (5 times) – with Stan Hansen (3), Ashura Hara (1), and Yoji Anjo (1)
 Champion Carnival (2001)
 World's Strongest Tag Determination League (1984) – with Jumbo Tsuruta
 World's Strongest Tag Determination League (1986) – with Jumbo Tsuruta
 World's Strongest Tag Determination League (1989) – with Stan Hansen
 January 2 Korakuen Hall Heavyweight Battle Royal (1982)
 United National Title League (1986)
 Triple Crown Heavyweight Championship Tournament (2000)
 Champion's Carnival Technique Award (1982)
 World's Strongest Tag Determination League New Wave Award (1981) – with Ashura Hara
 World's Strongest Tag Determination League Fighting Spirit Award (1982) – with Ashura Hara
 World's Strongest Tag Determination League Technique Award (1983) – with Jumbo Tsuruta
 World's Strongest Tag Determination League Outstanding Performance Award (1985) – with Jumbo Tsuruta
 World's Strongest Tag Determination League Outstanding Performance Award (1987) – with Ashura Hara
 World's Strongest Tag Determination League Outstanding Fighting Spirit Award (1987) – with Ashura Hara
 World's Strongest Tag Determination League Fighting Spirit Award (1988) – with Toshiaki Kawada
 World's Strongest Tag Determination League Best Player Award (1989)
Fighting World of Japan Pro Wrestling
 WMG Tag Team Championship (1 time) – with Riki Choshu
 HUSTLE
 Hustle Super Tag Team Championship (1 time) – with Tadao Yasuda
International Professional Wrestling Hall of Fame
Class of 2022
 Mid-Atlantic Championship Wrestling/World Championship Wrestling
 NWA Mid-Atlantic Tag Team Championship (1 time) – with Mr. Fuji
 NWA World Six-Man Tag Team Championship (1 time) – with The Road Warriors
 New Japan Pro-Wrestling
 IWGP Heavyweight Championship (1 time)
 IWGP Tag Team Championship (1 time) – with Shiro Koshinaka
Nikkan Sports
Match of the Year (1999) vs. Keiji Mutoh on May 3
 Pro Wrestling Illustrated
 Ranked No. 44 of the 500 best singles wrestlers during the "PWI Years" in 2003
 Ranked No. 14 and 30 of the 100 best tag teams of the "PWI Years" with Jumbo Tsuruta and Ashura Hara, respectively,  in 2003
 Super World of Sports
 SWS vs WWF Tournament (1990)
 One Night Tag Team Tournament (1990) – with Koji Kitao
 Tenryu Project
 Tenryu Project World 6-Man Tag Team Championship (1 time) – with Arashi and Tomohiro Ishii
 Hidden Genius R League (2013) - with Ryuichi Kawakami
 Tokyo Sports
 Best Tag Team Award (1983, 1985) 
 Best Tag Team Award (1987) 
 Fighting Spirit Award (1983)
 Lifetime Achievement Award (2015)
 Match of the Year Award (1987) 
 Match of the Year Award (1988) 
 Match of the Year Award (1989) 
 Match of the Year Award (1991) 
 Match of the Year Award (1993) 
 Match of the Year Award (1994) 
 Match of the Year Award (1996) 
 Match of the Year Award (1999) 
 Match of the Year Award (2015) 
 MVP Award (1986, 1987, 1988, 1993)
 Outstanding Performance Award (1981, 1984, 1996)
 Technique Award (1990)
 Wrestle Association "R"
 J-1 Heavyweight Championship (1 time)
 WAR World Six-Man Tag Team Championship (2 times) – with Koki Kitahara and Animal Hamaguchi (1), and Nobutaka Araya and Último Dragón (1)
 Six Man Tag Team Tournament (1994) - with Atsushi Onita and Crusher Bam Bam Bigelow
One Night Tag Team Tournament (1995) - with Último Dragón
J-1 Heavyweight Championship Tournament (1998)
 Wrestling Observer Newsletter
 Match of the Year (2001) 
 Wrestling Observer Newsletter Hall of Fame (Class of 1996)

Sumo career record

Video games 
 Tenryū Gen'ichirō no Puroresu Revolution
 HammerLock Wrestling
  Fire Pro Wrestling: Combination Tag
  Fire Pro Wrestling 2nd Bout
  Fire Pro Wrestling 3 Legend Bout
  Super Fire Pro Wrestling
  Super Fire Pro Wrestling 2
  Super Fire Pro Wrestling III: Final Bout
  Super Fire Pro Wrestling III: Easy Type
  Super Fire Pro Wrestling Special
  Super Fire Pro Wrestling X
  Super Fire Pro Wrestling X Premium
 Gekitou Burning Pro Wrestling
  Fire Pro Wrestling Returns
  Super Star Pro Wrestling
  Virtual Pro Wrestling 64
Virtual Pro Wrestling 2: Ōdō Keishō
King of Colosseum: Red
King of Colosseum II
Wrestle Kingdom
Wrestle Kingdom 2

See also 
 List of past sumo wrestlers
 List of sumo tournament second division champions

References

External links 
 
 

1950 births
IWGP Heavyweight champions
Japanese male professional wrestlers
Japanese sumo wrestlers
Living people
Professional wrestling executives
Sumo people from Fukui Prefecture
20th-century professional wrestlers
21st-century professional wrestlers
IWGP Heavyweight Tag Team Champions
All Asia Tag Team Champions
World Tag Team Champions (AJPW)
Triple Crown Heavyweight Champions
Tenryu Project
WAR (wrestling promotion)
Tenryu Project World 6-Man Tag Team Champions
NWA International Tag Team Champions
PWF World Heavyweight Champions
PWF World Tag Team Champions